

Qualification criteria
A total of 56 bowlers will qualify to compete at the Games. Each country is allowed to enter a maximum of two male and two female athletes. Each gender has a quota of 14 nations (28 bowlers) for a total of 56 athletes.

Qualification timeline

Qualification summary

Men

Women

References

P
Qualification for the 2015 Pan American Games
Bowling at the 2015 Pan American Games